Frenchman Creek is a stream in Ste. Genevieve County in the U.S. state of Missouri. It is a tributary of the Mississippi River.

A variant name was "Sugar Creek". A large share of the first settlers being of French descent accounts for the present name.

See also
List of rivers of Missouri

References

Rivers of Ste. Genevieve County, Missouri
Rivers of Missouri